Rachid Ahmed Bouhenna (born 29 June 1991) is a professional footballer who plays as a defender for Greek Super League club Ionikos. Born in France, he represented Algeria at under-23 international level.

Club career
In June 2015, Bouhenna signed a three-year contract with MC Alger. In August 2018 he joined Scottish side Dundee United on a two year deal.

On 29 July 2019, Bouhenna signed a two-year contract with Sepsi OSK Sfântu Gheorghe.

Career statistics

Club

Honours
MC Alger
Algerian Cup: 2015–16
Algerian Super Cup runner-up: 2016

Sepsi OSK
Cupa României runner-up: 2019–20

CFR Cluj
Liga I: 2021–22
Supercupa României runner-up: 2021

References

External links

1989 births
Living people
Sportspeople from Oise
Association football defenders
Algeria under-23 international footballers
Algerian footballers
French footballers
Footballers from Hauts-de-France
Algerian Ligue Professionnelle 1 players
AS Beauvais Oise players
CS Sedan Ardennes players
CS Constantine players
Doncaster Rovers F.C. players
Dundee United F.C. players
Scottish Professional Football League players
French sportspeople of Algerian descent
MC Alger players
Liga I players
Super League Greece players
Sepsi OSK Sfântu Gheorghe players
CFR Cluj players
FC Steaua București players
AFC Compiègne players
Ionikos F.C. players
Algerian expatriate footballers
French expatriate footballers
Algerian expatriate sportspeople in Belgium
Algerian expatriate sportspeople in England
Algerian expatriate sportspeople in Scotland
Algerian expatriate sportspeople in Romania
Algerian expatriate sportspeople in Greece
French expatriate sportspeople in Belgium
French expatriate sportspeople in England
French expatriate sportspeople in Scotland
French expatriate sportspeople in Romania
French expatriate sportspeople in Greece
Expatriate footballers in Belgium
Expatriate footballers in England
Expatriate footballers in Romania
Expatriate footballers in Scotland
Expatriate footballers in Greece